David Calkin (born 1 March 1945) is a New Zealand cricketer. He played in four first-class matches for Central Districts in 1969/70.

See also
 List of Central Districts representative cricketers

References

External links
 

1945 births
Living people
New Zealand cricketers
Central Districts cricketers
Cricketers from Palmerston North